The 2021 Colorado Rapids season was the club's twenty-sixth season of existence and their twenty-sixth consecutive season in Major League Soccer (MLS), the top flight of American soccer.

Background

Colorado finished the 2020 season 5th in the Western Conference table, and 10th overall in MLS. Jonathan Lewis and Cole Bassett lead Colorado with 5 goals across all competitions. Outside of MLS play, the Rapids played in the MLS is Back Tournament, getting knocked out in the group stage. They were also scheduled to compete in the U.S. Open Cup before its cancellation due to the COVID-19 pandemic.

Roster

Out on loan

Competitions

Preseason

Friendlies

Major League Soccer

Standings

Western Conference

Overall table

Results summary

Results by round

Match results

MLS Cup Playoffs
The Rapids clinched the regular season Western Conference title on the last day of the season, November 7. They lost to the Portland Timbers in the Western Conference Semifinals on November 25.

U.S. Open Cup

It was announced on March 29 that the opening round of the tournament would not be held, and that the top eight MLS teams based on point per game from the first three weeks of the season would participate in the tournament. U.S. Soccer's Open Cup Committee announced it was not holding the 2021 U.S. Open Cup in the spring, but did not rule out holding the tournament later in the year. At the conclusion of the first three weeks of the season, the Rapids had gained 1.33 PPG, but that was not enough to qualify for the tournament. Eventually, it was announced that the U.S. Open Cup would not be held at all in 2021.

Qualification

Statistics

Appearances and goals
Numbers after plus–sign (+) denote appearances as a substitute.

|-
! colspan=14 style=background:#dcdcdc; text-align:center| Players transferred/loaned out during the season

Top scorers
{| class="wikitable" style="font-size: 95%; text-align: center;"
|-
!width=30|Rank
!width=30|Position
!width=30|Number
!width=175|Name
!width=75|
!width=75|
!width=75|Total
|-
|rowspan=1| 1
| FW || 12 ||  Michael Barrios
| 8 || 0 || 8
|-
|rowspan=1| 2
| FW || 7 ||  Jonathan Lewis
| 7 || 0 || 7
|-
|rowspan=3| 3
| FW || 8 ||  Dominique Badji
| 5 || 0 || 5
|-
| FW || 11 ||  Diego Rubio
| 5 || 0 || 5
|-
| MF || 26 ||  Cole Bassett
| 5 || 0 || 5
|-
|rowspan=1| 6
| FW || 9 ||  Andre Shinyashiki
| 4 || 0 || 4
|-
|rowspan=4| 7
| DF || 2 ||  Keegan Rosenberry
| 2 || 0 || 2
|-
| DF || 4 ||  Danny Wilson
| 2 || 0 || 2
|-
| DF || 6 ||  Lalas Abubakar
| 2 || 0 || 2
|-
| FW || 52 ||  Braian Galván
| 2 || 0 || 2
|-
|rowspan=7| 11
| DF || 5 ||  Auston Trusty
| 1 || 0 || 1
|-
| DF || 13 ||  Sam Vines
| 1 || 0 || 1
|-
| MF || 20 ||  Nicolás Mezquida
| 1 || 0 || 1
|-
| MF || 21 ||  Younes Namli
| 1 || 0 || 1
|-
| MF || 23 ||  Kellyn Acosta
| 1 || 0 || 1
|-
| MF || 32 ||  Collen Warner
| 1 || 0 || 1
|-
| DF || 66 ||  Lucas Esteves
| 1 || 0 || 1
|-
!colspan="4"|Total !! 50 !! 0 !! 50
|-

Top assists
{| class="wikitable" style="font-size: 95%; text-align: center;"
|-
!width=30|Rank
!width=30|Position
!width=30|Number
!width=175|Name
!width=75|
!width=75|
!width=75|Total
|-
|rowspan=1| 1
| MF || 19 ||  Jack Price
| 12 || 0 || 12
|-
|rowspan=1| 2
| FW || 12 ||  Michael Barrios
| 5 || 0 || 5
|-
|rowspan=1| 3
| FW || 11 ||  Diego Rubio
| 4 || 0 || 4
|-
|rowspan=2| 4
| MF || 26 ||  Cole Bassett
| 3 || 0 || 3
|-
| FW || 52 ||  Braian Galván
| 3 || 0 || 3
|-
|rowspan=2| 6
| FW || 9 ||  Andre Shinyashiki
| 2 || 0 || 2
|-
| MF || 23 ||  Kellyn Acosta
| 2 || 0 || 2
|-
|rowspan=7| 8
| FW || 7 ||  Jonathan Lewis
| 1 || 0 || 1
|-
| FW || 10 ||  Nicolas Benezet
| 1 || 0 || 1
|-
| DF || 13 ||  Sam Vines
| 1 || 0 || 1
|-
| MF || 14 ||  Mark-Anthony Kaye
| 1 || 0 || 1
|-
| MF || 20 ||  Nicolás Mezquida
| 1 || 0 || 1
|-
| MF || 21 ||  Younes Namli
| 1 || 0 || 1
|-
| DF || 33 ||  Steven Beitashour
| 1 || 0 || 1
|-
!colspan="4"|Total !! 38 !! 0 !! 38
|-

Clean sheets
{| class="wikitable" style="font-size: 95%; text-align: center;"
|-
!width=30|Rank
!width=30|Number
!width=175|Name
!width=75|
!width=75|
!width=75|Total
|-
| 1
| 22 ||  William Yarbrough 
| 13 || 0 || 13
|-
!colspan="3"|Total !! 13 !! 0 !! 13

Disciplinary record
{| class="wikitable" style="text-align:center;"
|-
| rowspan="2" !width=15|Rank
| rowspan="2" !width=15|
| rowspan="2" !width=15|
| rowspan="2" !width=120|Player
| colspan="3"|MLS
| colspan="3"|MLS Cup Playoffs
| colspan="3"|Total
|-
!width=34; background:#fe9;|
!width=34; background:#fe9;|
!width=34; background:#ff8888;|
!width=34; background:#fe9;|
!width=34; background:#fe9;|
!width=34; background:#ff8888;|
!width=34; background:#fe9;|
!width=34; background:#fe9;|
!width=34; background:#ff8888;|
|-
|rowspan=2| 1
| 4 || DF ||  Danny Wilson
| 8 || 0 || 1 || 0 || 0 || 0 || 8 || 0 || 1
|-
| 19 || MF ||  Jack Price
| 9 || 0 || 0 || 0 || 0 || 0 || 9 || 0 || 0
|-
|rowspan=2| 3
| 32 || MF ||  Collen Warner
| 7 || 0 || 0 || 0 || 0 || 0 || 7 || 0 || 0
|-
| 11 || FW ||  Diego Rubio
| 7 || 0 || 0 || 0 || 0 || 0 || 7 || 0 || 0
|-
|rowspan=1| 5
| 6 || DF ||  Lalas Abubakar
| 6 || 0 || 0 || 0 || 0 || 0 || 6 || 0 || 0
|-
|rowspan=3| 6
| 5 || DF ||  Auston Trusty
| 4 || 0 || 0 || 0 || 0 || 0 || 4 || 0 || 0
|-
| 9 || FW ||  Andre Shinyashiki
| 4 || 0 || 0 || 0 || 0 || 0 || 4 || 0 || 0
|-
| 52 || FW ||  Braian Galván
| 4 || 0 || 0 || 0 || 0 || 0 || 4 || 0 || 0
|-
|rowspan=2| 9
| 12 || FW ||  Michael Barrios
| 3 || 0 || 0 || 0 || 0 || 0 || 3 || 0 || 0
|-
| 26 || MF ||  Cole Bassett
| 3 || 0 || 0 || 0 || 0 || 0 || 3 || 0 || 0
|-
|rowspan=6| 11
| 66 || DF ||  Lucas Esteves
| 1 || 0 || 1 || 0 || 0 || 0 || 1 || 0 || 1
|-
| 2 || DF ||  Keegan Rosenberry
| 2 || 0 || 0 || 0 || 0 || 0 || 2 || 0 || 0
|-
| 14 || MF ||  Mark-Anthony Kaye
| 2 || 0 || 0 || 0 || 0 || 0 || 2 || 0 || 0
|-
| 20 || MF ||  Nicolás Mezquida
| 2 || 0 || 0 || 0 || 0 || 0 || 2 || 0 || 0
|-
| 21 || MF ||  Younes Namli
| 2 || 0 || 0 || 0 || 0 || 0 || 2 || 0 || 0
|-
| 23 || MF ||  Kellyn Acosta
| 2 || 0 || 0 || 0 || 0 || 0 || 2 || 0 || 0
|-
|rowspan=6| 17
| 7 || FW ||  Jonathan Lewis
| 1 || 0 || 0 || 0 || 0 || 0 || 1 || 0 || 0
|-
| 8 || FW ||  Dominique Badji
| 1 || 0 || 0 || 0 || 0 || 0 || 1 || 0 || 0
|-
| 13 || DF ||  Sam Vines
| 1 || 0 || 0 || 0 || 0 || 0 || 1 || 0 || 0
|-
| 22 || GK ||  William Yarbrough
| 1 || 0 || 0 || 0 || 0 || 0 || 1 || 0 || 0
|-
| 33 || DF ||  Steven Beitashour
| 1 || 0 || 0 || 0 || 0 || 0 || 1 || 0 || 0
|-
| 37 || FW ||  Dantouma Toure
| 1 || 0 || 0 || 0 || 0 || 0 || 1 || 0 || 0
|-
!colspan="4"|Total !! 72 !! 0 !! 2 !! 0 !! 0 !! 0 !! 72 !! 0 !! 2

Transfers

For transfers in, dates listed are when the Rapids officially signed the players to the roster. For transfers out, dates are listed when the Rapids officially removed the players from the roster, not when they signed with another club. If a player later signed with a different club, his new club will be noted, but the date listed remains when he was officially removed from the roster.

In

Loans in

SuperDraft

Draft picks are not automatically signed to the team roster. Only those who are signed to a contract will be listed as transfers in. Only trades involving draft picks and executed after the start of the 2021 MLS SuperDraft will be listed in the notes.

Out

Loans out

See also
 Colorado Rapids
 2021 in American soccer
 2021 Major League Soccer season

References

Colorado Rapids seasons
Colorado Rapids
Colorado Rapids
Colorado Rapids